John Maguire (born 19 May 1983) is an English mixed martial artist currently competing in Cage Warriors' Welterweight division. A professional competitor since 2006, Maguire has also competed for the UFC, Cage Rage, BAMMA, Absolute Championship Berkut, Konfrontacja Sztuk Walki, and UCMMA. Maguire is the former UCMMA Welterweight Champion.

Background
Maguire is from Peterborough, England, and was first exposed to mixed martial arts growing up, watching UFC events with his brother. A member of the English gypsy community,  he left school when he was only 13 years old and taught himself how to read and write, while working in the logging and timber industry with his father, as well as working various other jobs before becoming a professional fighter.

Mixed martial arts career

Early career
Maguire made his professional MMA debut in April 2006. Over the next two years, he won all eight of his first bouts via TKO or submission with no fight going past the second round. Before signing with the UFC, he added an additional eight wins and three losses to his MMA record. He won the UCMMA Welterweight Championship on 18 September 2010, at UCMMA 15: Showdown, defeating Henrique Santana via TKO. He has defended it three times since then. 

He holds victories over domestic UK standouts TUF 9 alumnus Dean Amasinger, UCMMA UK1 Welterweight Champion Peter Irving, UK MMA veteran Jamaine Facey and two wins over current UCMMA Middleweight Champion and UCMMA Welterweight Champion Jake Bostwick.

Ultimate Fighting Championship
Maguire was scheduled to make his UFC debut against James Head at UFC 138. However, Head was forced to withdraw due to injury and he instead took on The Ultimate Fighter 13 veteran Justin Edwards. Maguire won the fight via unanimous decision.

Maguire fought The Ultimate Fighter 9 finalist, DaMarques Johnson, at UFC on Fuel TV 2 on 14 April 2012. He won the fight by submission via armbar at 4:40 of the second frame. His performance was awarded with Submission of the Night honors.

Maguire lost via unanimous decision to John Hathaway on 29 September 2012 at UFC on Fuel TV 5. Maguire faced Matthew Riddle at UFC 154, stepping in to replace an injured Besam Yousef. Maguire lost the fight via unanimous decision. He then faced Mitch Clarke in his Lightweight debut on 15 June 2013 at UFC 161. He lost the bout by unanimous decision. He was subsequently released from the promotion afterwards.

Cage Warriors
Following his UFC release, Maguire signed with Cage Warriors on 31 October 2013. He made his debut against Philip Mulpeter at Cage Warriors 63 on 31 December 2013. He won the fight via unanimous decision.

He then faced Saul Rogers at Cage Warriors 65 on 1 March 2014. In a shocking upset, Rogers would defeat the heavy favorite Maguire via unanimous decision.

Maguire made a quick turnaround and faced Damir Hadžović at Cage Warriors 66 on 22 March 2014. He lost the fight via TKO in the first round.

Championships and accomplishments
Olympian MMA Championships
OMMAC Welterweight Championship (One time)
Ultimate Challenge MMA
UCMMA Welterweight Championship (One time)
Ultimate Fighting Championship
Submission of the Night (One time)

Mixed martial arts record

|-
| Loss
| align=center| 26–13
| Sam Boult
| Decision (split)
| Caged Steel FC 23
| 
| align=center| 3
| align=center| 5:00
| Sheffield, England 
| <small>
|-
| Loss
| align=center| 26–12
| Brad Wheeler
| TKO (punches)
| Cage Warriors 102
| 
| align=center| 2
| align=center| 2:43
| London, England 
| <small>
|-
| Loss
| align=center| 26–11
| Stefano Paternò
| KO (punch)
| IFC 3
| 
| align=center| 1
| align=center| 2:46
| Milan, Italy
| For IFC Welterweight Championship.
|-
| Win
| align=center| 26–10
| Leonardo Damiani
| Submission (guillotine choke)
| Legio's Team Bergamo: Venkon Fight Night 2
| 
| align=center| 1
| align=center| 2:48
| Milan, Italy
|
|-
| Loss
| align=center| 25–10
| Tommy Depret
| TKO (punches)
| Cage Warriors 89
| 
| align=center| 3
| align=center| 3:10
| Antwerp, Poland
|
|-
| Win
| align=center| 25–9
| Shah Hussain
| Submission (heel hook)
| Rise of Champions 4
| 
| align=center| 2
| align=center| 3:05
| Brentwood, England
|
|-
| Loss
| align=center| 24–9
| Borys Mańkowski
| Decision (unanimous)
| KSW 37: Circus of Pain
| 
| align=center| 3
| align=center| 5:00
| Kraków, Poland
|For KSW Welterweight Championship.
|-
| Win
| align=center| 24–8
| Kieran Malone
| Submission (Kimura)
| |ACB 47: Braveheart: Young Eagles 14
| 
| align=center| 3
| align=center| 4:31
| Glasgow, Scotland
| 
|-
| Win
| align=center| 23–8
| Colin Fletcher
| Submission (Armbar)
| M4TC 21 Supremacy 
| 
| align=center| 3
| align=center| 1:03
| Tyne and Wear, England
| Won M4TC Welterweight Championship.
|-
| Win
| align=center| 22–8
| Vincent del Guerra
| Submission (Rear-Naked Choke)
| British Challenge MMA 15
| 
| align=center| 1
| align=center| 0:55
| Colchester, Essex, England
|
|-
| Win
| align=center| 21–8
| Aymard Guih
| Decision (unanimous)
| British Challenge MMA 14
| 
| align=center| 3
| align=center| 5:00
| Colchester, Essex, England
|Return to Welterweight.
|-
| Win
| align=center| 20–8
| Alexandre Roumette
| Submission (kimura)
| British Challenge MMA 12
| 
| align=center| 1
| align=center| 3:09
| Colchester, Essex, England
|Catchweight (165 lbs) bout.
|-
| Loss
| align=center| 19–8
| Damir Hadžović
| KO (knees and punches)
| Cage Warriors Fighting Championship 66
| 
| align=center| 1
| align=center| 3:58
| Ballerup, Denmark
| 
|-
| Loss
| align=center| 19–7
| Saul Rogers
| Decision (unanimous)
| Cage Warriors Fighting Championship 65
| 
| align=center| 3
| align=center| 5:00
| Dublin, Leinster, Ireland 
| 
|-
| Win
| align=center| 19–6
| Philip Mulpeter
| Decision (unanimous)
| Cage Warriors Fighting Championship 63
| 
| align=center| 3
| align=center| 5:00
| Dublin, Leinster, Ireland 
|Catchweight (161 lbs) bout.
|-
| Loss
| align=center| 18–6
| Mitch Clarke
| Decision (unanimous)
| UFC 161
| 
| align=center| 3
| align=center| 5:00
| Winnipeg, Manitoba, Canada
| Lightweight debut.
|-
| Loss
| align=center| 18–5
| Matthew Riddle
| Decision (unanimous)
| UFC 154
| 
| align=center| 3
| align=center| 5:00
| Montreal, Quebec, Canada
| 
|-
| Loss
| align=center| 18–4
| John Hathaway
| Decision (unanimous)
| UFC on Fuel TV: Struve vs. Miocic
| 
| align=center| 3
| align=center| 5:00
| Nottingham, England
| 
|-
| Win
| align=center| 18–3
| DaMarques Johnson
| Submission (armbar)
| UFC on Fuel TV: Gustafsson vs. Silva
| 
| align=center| 2
| align=center| 4:40
| Stockholm, Sweden
| Submission of the Night.
|-
| Win
| align=center| 17–3
| Justin Edwards
| Decision (unanimous)
| UFC 138
| 
| align=center| 3
| align=center| 5:00
| Birmingham, England
| 
|-
| Win
| align=center| 16–3
| Peter Irving
| Decision (unanimous)
| UCMMA 23: Go 4 It
| 
| align=center| 3
| align=center| 5:00
| London, England
| Defended UCMMA Welterweight Championship.
|-
| Win
| align=center| 15–3
| Jamaine Facey
| Submission (kimura)
| UCMMA 20: Fists of Fire
| 
| align=center| 2
| align=center| 4:23
| London, England
| Defended UCMMA Welterweight Championship.
|-
| Win
| align=center| 14–3
| Dean Amasinger
| Submission (rear-naked choke)
| UCMMA 18: Face Off
| 
| align=center| 2
| align=center| 3:28
| London, England
| Defended UCMMA Welterweight Championship.
|-
| Win
| align=center| 13–3
| Henrique Santana
| TKO (doctor stoppage)
| UCMMA 15: Showdown
| 
| align=center| 2
| align=center| 1:25
| London, England
| Won UCMMA Welterweight Championship.
|-
| Win
| align=center| 12–3
| Wayne Murrie
| Decision (split)
| OMMAC 6
| 
| align=center| 3
| align=center| 5:00
| Liverpool, England
| Won OMMAC Welterweight Championship.
|-
| Loss
| align=center| 11–3
| Simeon Thoresen
| Decision (unanimous)
| BAMMA 3
| 
| align=center| 3
| align=center| 5:00
| Birmingham, England
| 
|-
| Win
| align=center| 11–2
| Edgelson Lua
| Decision (split)
| UCMMA 10: Resurrection
| 
| align=center| 3
| align=center| 5:00
| London, England
| Welterweight debut.
|-
| Loss
| align=center| 10–2
| Tom Watson
| TKO (punches)
| BAMMA 1
| 
| align=center| 3
| align=center| 2:47
| London, England
| 
|-
| Win
| align=center| 10–1
| Chris Rice
| Decision (unanimous)
| CG 10: Clash of the Titans
| 
| align=center| 3
| align=center| 5:00
| Liverpool, England
| 
|-
| Win
| align=center| 9–1
| Lee Austin
| Submission
| UK: Cage Fighting Championships
| 
| align=center| 1
| align=center| 4:20
| Coventry, England
| 
|-
| Loss
| align=center| 8–1
| Arman Gambaryan
| Decision (unanimous)
| WAFC: World Pankration Championship 2008
| 
| align=center| 2
| align=center| 5:00
| Khabarovsk, Russia
| 
|-
| Win
| align=center| 8–0
| Andy Costello
| Submission (rear-naked choke)
| Pain and Glory: ExCeL London
| 
| align=center| 1
| align=center| N/A
| London, England
| 
|-
| Win
| align=center| 7–0
| Jake Bostwick
| Submission (kimura)
| Cage Rage Contenders 6
| 
| align=center| 1
| align=center| 4:00
| London, England
| 
|-
| Win
| align=center| 6–0
| Jake Bostwick
| TKO (punches)
| Cage Rage Contenders 5
| 
| align=center| 1
| align=center| N/A
| East London, England
| 
|-
| Win
| align=center| 5–0
| Alex Korsters
| TKO
| Intense Fighting
| 
| align=center| 2
| align=center| 3:30
| Peterborough, England
| 
|-
| Win
| align=center| 4–0
| Ed Garass
| Submission (rear-naked choke)
| UKMMAC 18: Fists of Fury
| 
| align=center| 1
| align=center| 0:55
| Purfleet, England
| 
|-
| Win
| align=center| 3–0
| Michael Pastou
| Submission (rear-naked choke)
| Intense Fighting: Caged
| 
| align=center| 1
| align=center| 2:46
| England
| 
|-
| Win
| align=center| 2–0
| Bill Mutch
| Submission (rear-naked choke)
| Intense Fighting 5
| 
| align=center| 1
| align=center| 2:05
| England
| 
|-
| Win
| align=center| 1–0
| Lee Webber
| Technical Submission
| Intense Fighting 3
| 
| align=center| 2
| align=center| 0:27
| England
|

References

External links
 
 

1983 births
Sportspeople from Peterborough
Living people
English male mixed martial artists
British people of Irish descent
English practitioners of Brazilian jiu-jitsu
Welterweight mixed martial artists
Mixed martial artists utilizing Brazilian jiu-jitsu
Ultimate Fighting Championship male fighters